Rubén Zarazúa Rocha (born 17 December 1941) is a Mexican politician affiliated with the Institutional Revolutionary Party. As of 2014 he served as Senator of the LVIII and LIX Legislatures of the Mexican Congress representing Nuevo León as replacement of Jesús Ricardo Canavati Tafich.

References

1941 births
Living people
Politicians from Nuevo León
Members of the Senate of the Republic (Mexico)
Institutional Revolutionary Party politicians
21st-century Mexican politicians